Shippin' Out is an album by jazz organist Groove Holmes recorded in 1977 and released on the Groove Merchant label the following year.

Reception 

Allmusic's Scott Yanow called it a "fine Muse LP, which would be followed by several other rewarding efforts" stating "Back in a comfortable setting, heading a soul-jazz quintet ... Holmes explores a wider range of songs than usual".

Track listing
 "Feelings" (Morris Albert) – 7:17
 "Windows" (Chick Corea) – 6:38
 "Stella by Starlight" (Victor Young, Ned Washington) – 5:28
 "Where or When" (Richard Rodgers, Lorenz Hart) – 9:05
 "Shippin' Out" (Grrove Holmes, David Schnitter) – 10:10

Personnel
Groove Holmes – organ
David Schnitter − tenor saxophone
Steve Giordano − guitar
Idris Muhammad − drums
Buddy Caldwell – congas

References

Muse Records albums
Richard Holmes (organist) albums
1978 albums
Albums recorded at Van Gelder Studio